Jordan Crooks (born 2 May 2002) is a Caymanian competitive swimmer. He won the first medal of any color and first gold medal for the Cayman Islands at the FINA World Short Course Swimming Championships. He also holds nine national records for the Cayman Islands.

Career
Crooks qualified for the 2022 World Aquatics Championships in Budapest and the 2022 FINA World Short Course Swimming Championships in Melbourne. He won the gold medal in the men's 50 m freestyle event at the 2022 FINA World Short Course Swimming Championships beating Ben Proud, the defending champion.

Currently, Crooks swims for the Tennessee Volunteers swim team. In his freshman year, he swam a freshman record 18.53 50 yard freestyle as well as a freshman record 41.44 100 yard freestyle.

On February 15, Crooks became the second man to ever swim a sub 18-second 50 yard freestyle as he won gold in the SEC championship, setting an SEC record in the process.

Personal life
Crooks has a sister named Jillian Crooks who also swims competitively.

References

External links

2002 births
Living people
Caymanian male swimmers
Swimmers at the 2018 Summer Youth Olympics
Medalists at the FINA World Swimming Championships (25 m)
Tennessee Volunteers men's swimmers